CityVarsity School of Media and Creative Arts is a private higher education institution in South Africa with campuses in Cape Town and Johannesburg. It falls under Educor and offers full-time, short, and online degrees, diplomas, and certificates in the creative arts and media.

History
Seeking to provide quality creative arts and media career training and education, Educor founded CityVarsity in Cape Town in 1996. It was officially registered as Private Higher Education Institution with the Department of Higher Education and Training in 1997 and accredited by the Council on Higher Education. The second campus in Johannesburg opened in 2007. The Cape Town campus moved from Park & Kloof Street to Roeland Street in 2014. CityVarsity has seen and increase in international students over the duration of its existence.

Courses and student life
CityVarsity has been honing South Africa’s creative talent since 1996, offering a wide variety of courses including Animation, Journalism, Professional Acting and many more. Students often take on work experience during their studies.

Bachelor of Arts:
 Film and Television
 Professional Acting for Camera
 Sound and Music Technology

Diploma:

 Animation
 Film and Television Production Techniques
 Multimedia Design and Production
 Professional Acting for Camera
 Professional Photography
 Sound Engineering

Certificate:

 Acting for Camera
 Art Direction
 Digital Media Arts
 Motion Picture Make-up
 New Media Development

Short programmes:

 Acting for Camera 1
 Basic Photography
 Camerawork and Lighting
 Creative Writing
 Digital Video Editing
 Directing
 Graphic Design and Digital Media
 Introduction to DSLR Filming
 Music Production
 Scriptwriting
 Short Video Production
 Sound Design and Post Production
 TV Presenting
 Vocal Training for Radio

Notable people
 Gérard Rudolf, head of drama 1998–2002

Alumni
 Garth Breytenbach
 Clint Brink
 Joe Daly
 Oshosheni Hiveluah
 Mapaseka Koetle-Nyokong
 Elvira Lind
 Mamarumo Marokane
 Michael Matthews
 Bongo Mbutuma
 Tariro Mnangagwa
 Clarence Peters
 Meganne Young
 Marlin Van Noie

References

External links
 CityVarsity on Educor

1996 establishments in South Africa
Arts schools in South Africa
Educational institutions established in 1996
Mass media in Cape Town
Mass media in Johannesburg